Tomcats is a 2001 American sex comedy film written and directed by Gregory Poirier.  It stars Jerry O'Connell, Shannon Elizabeth, and Jake Busey. This film also features Dakota Fanning in her film debut.

It is the first film released by Revolution Studios.

Plot 
A group of boys, Michael Delaney, Kyle Brenner, Steve and others, are talking before the wedding ceremony of one of their friends. They agree to a pact whereby they will all invest in a fund that only the last bachelor will inherit.

Michael goes to Las Vegas years later with Steve and his girlfriend. After going back to their room, he mistakenly thinks she wants him to say "I love you". He panics and kicks her out of the room and she dumps him. He goes on a bender and picks up a sultry redhead who encourages him to gamble at the roulette table. He goes on an amazing run of bad luck losing everything and taking out credit from the casino. In the end, the casino intervenes and he is summoned to meet the pit boss Carlos. Carlos informs Michael how serious the trouble he is in and what will happen if he fails to repay the debt.

Michael realizes that Kyle and him are now the last men standing and stand to inherit the entire fund, which has swelled to an enormous amount. He approaches Kyle and learns that the latter is wealthy and a jerk. He decides that his only option is to set Kyle up so that Michael can inherit the fund. He learns on a drunken night that Kyle has only ever loved one woman, a lady named Natalie, whom he met at Steve's wife Tricia's sister's wedding.

Michael approaches Steve and Tricia and finds out where Natalie is. Unfortunately, they neglect to tell him that Natalie is a police detective. Natalie is working undercover as a streetwalker when Michael finds her and he inadvertently gets himself arrested for solicitation. During interrogation, he admits everything and is eventually released.

Natalie visits him and agrees to go in with his plan on the basis that she gets half the money. He finds out that Kyle's memory of Natalie and his night together left out some important details, notably when Natalie woke up Kyle had bolted, leaving her with a bag of quarters to get a cab home.

Michael and Natalie decide to spend time together investigating Kyle in order to ensure their plan works. It all appears to be working until Michael realizes he is falling in love with Natalie. Natalie too is falling for Michael, but decides to go ahead with marrying Kyle. During the bachelor party, Kyle informs Michael that he has no intention of quitting womanizing and believes Natalie to be the perfect stay-at-home wife.

Before Michael can act and prevent the wedding, he is knocked unconscious by a bowling ball. He wakes up and discovers that his clothes are missing. He grabs some clothing from an unconscious stripper and tries to run to the civic hall to prevent the marriage. After a number of misadventures, Michael finally arrives, but learns that he is too late and Kyle has already married Natalie. He leaves, somewhat dejected.

Michael goes on to claim the fund and thereby settles his debt with Carlos. He later bumps into Kyle who is on a date with another girl and punches him as he believes Kyle to be cheating on Natalie. Kyle beats up Michael and then discloses that he has split with Natalie. On their wedding night, she knocked him unconscious and when he woke up, he found a bag of quarters. Michael runs off to find Natalie and finds her again working undercover. He proposes that they date and he gives up his tomcat ways. The pair ultimately marry. Kyle ends up with the librarian Michael was with earlier.

Cast

Reception   
Tomcats has a 14% approval rating on Rotten Tomatoes from 76 critics. The consensus is: "Why even bother? You already know if you're going to see it or not." On Metacritic, the film has a score of 15 out of 100 based on 19 critics, indicating "overwhelming dislike". Peter Travers of Rolling Stone said "Tomcats is laced with such rampant misogyny that the laughs stick in your throat." The New York Times said, "The film is enthusiastically vulgar but not particularly funny, perhaps because it too often loses the distinction between gross-out humor and the merely gross."

References

External links 

 
 

2001 films
2000s sex comedy films
American sex comedy films
2000s English-language films
American black comedy films
2001 directorial debut films
Columbia Pictures films
Revolution Studios films
Films scored by David Kitay
2001 comedy films
2000s American films